Phanaeus may refer to:

 Phanaeus (beetle), a genus of beetles
 Phanaeus (epithet), one of several epithets for the Greek god Apollo